The Richmond-class frigates were 32-gun sailing frigates of the fifth rate produced for the Royal Navy. They were designed in 1756 by the Navy's Surveyor, William Bately, and were his equivalent of the s designed by Bately's co-Surveyor, Thomas Slade. They were faster ships than the Southamptons, and were weatherly craft, remaining dry even in high seas. Three ships were ordered to this design between 1756 and 1757, while a second batch of three ships was ordered between 1761 and 1762 to a slightly modified design.

Ships in class

First batch
 
 Ordered: 12 March 1756
 Built by:  John Buxton, Deptford.
 Keel laid:  April 1756
 Launched:  12 November 1757
 Completed:  7 December 1757 at Deptford Dockyard.
 Fate:  Burnt at Sardinia to avoid capture on 19 May 1793.
 
 Ordered: 1 June 1756
 Built by:  William Alexander, Rotherhithe.
 Keel laid:  June 1756
 Launched:  29 September 1757
 Completed:  6 November 1757 at Deptford Dockyard.
 Fate:  Burnt at Rhode Island to avoid capture on 5 August 1778.
 
 Ordered: 11 January 1757
 Built by:  Henry Adams, Bucklers Hard.
 Keel laid: February 1757
 Launched:  10 April 1758
 Completed:  29 May 1758 at Portsmouth Dockyard.
 Fate:  Taken to pieces at Woolwich Dockyard in September 1803.

Second (modified) batch
 
 Ordered: 24 March 1761
 Built by: Elias Bird, Rotherhithe.
 Keel laid:  5 May 1761
 Launched:  10 May 1762
 Completed:  9 July 1762 at Deptford Dockyard.
 Fate:  Burnt at Rhode Island to avoid capture on 5 August 1778.
 
 Ordered: 24 March 1761
 Built by: Robert Inwood, Rotherhithe.
 Keel laid:  5 May 1761
 Launched:  11 May 1762
 Completed:  16 July 1762 at Deptford Dockyard.
 Fate:  Taken to pieces at Plymouth Dockyard in May 1811.
 
 Ordered: 30 January 1762
 Built by: Robert Batson, Limehouse.
 Keel laid:  1 April 1762
 Launched:  13 June 1763
 Completed:  19 September 1765 at Deptford Dockyard.
 Fate:  Sold at Chatham Dockyard on 10 February 1785.

References 

 David Lyon, The Sailing Navy List, Brasseys Publications, London 1993.
 Rif Winfield, British Warships in the Age of Sail, 1714 to 1792, Seaforth Publishing, London 2007.

Frigate classes
Ship classes of the Royal Navy